"Funky Sensation" is a song released in 1981 by American singer Gwen McCrae.

The song was written by Kenton Nix who also wrote "Heartbeat" for Taana Gardner. It was produced by Nix and Henry Batts.

"Funky Sensation" peaked at number 22 on the Billboard Black Singles chart and number 15 on the Club chart.

This song is also included in her eponymous 1981 album Gwen McCrae and it was sampled by numerous artists.

Track listing

1982 release  
12" vinyl
 US: Atlantic / DMD-286

Personnel 
Arrangement, producer, songwriter: Kenton Nix
Co-producer: Henry Batts
Executive producers: Henry Batts, Kenton Nix, Milton A. Simpson

Chart performance

Legacy
In 1981, old-school hip hop musician Afrika Bambaataa sampled the song for "Jazzy Sensation".
In 1994, [Sounds of Blackness] song entitled "I Believe"
In 1995, [Aswad] song entitled "One Shot Chiller"
in 1996, Rahsaan Patterson sampled the song for "Where You Are"
In 1996, Shyheim sampled the song for "Can You Feel It?" 
In 2000, the single was heavily sampled in the German language single "Get Up," by DJ Thomilla featuring Afrob
In 2002, Ja Rule sampled the song for "Last Temptations" 
In 2006, Leela James sampled the song for "Good Time"
In 2018, Disclosure heavily sampled the song for their single "Funky Sensation"

References

1981 singles
1981 songs
Atlantic Records singles
Gwen McCrae songs